George Wahl Logemann (31 January 1938, Milwaukee, – 5 June 2012, Hartford) was an American mathematician and computer scientist. He became well known for the Davis–Putnam–Logemann–Loveland algorithm to solve Boolean satisfiability problems. He also contributed to the field of computer music.

References

21st-century American mathematicians
American computer scientists
1938 births
2012 deaths
20th-century American mathematicians
People from Milwaukee
Mathematicians from Wisconsin